Oxovitisin A is an oxovitisin, a type of pyranoanthocyanin with a pyranone (2-pyrone) component. It is found in aged Port wines. It does not contain an oxonium ion component (flavylium cation), as anthocyanins do. Therefore, it does not have an absorption maximum at 520 nm. Oxovitisins are stable yellowish pigments with similar unique spectral features, displaying only a pronounced broad band around 370 nm in the UV−vis spectrum. It is an oxidative derivative of carboxypyranomalvidin-3-glucoside (vitisin A).

References 

Pyranoanthocyanins
Methoxy compounds